Alonso Tostado (also Al(f)onso Fernández de Madrigal, variously known as Alphonsus Tostatus,  Tostatus Abulensis, and in Spanish as El Tostado or El Abulense;  ca. 1410 – 3 September 1455)  was a Spanish theologian, councillor of John II of Castile and briefly bishop of Ávila. His epitaph stated "Wonder of earth, all men can know he scanned."

A leading scholar of his generation, he is particularly known as an early theorist on witchcraft; in his De maleficis mulieribus, quae vulgariter dicuntur bruxas (1440) he defended the possibility of flying witches based on biblical exegesis.

Life
Alonso's father, also called Alonso Tostado, was a ploughman. The nickname Tostado  refers to a ploughman's tanned or sunburnt complexion.
After a course of grammar under the Franciscans he entered the University of Salamanca, where, besides philosophy and theology, he studied civil and canon law, Greek, Hebrew, and the other branches then comprised in the curriculum of a university. By great application joined to an unusually brilliant mind and an extraordinarily retentive memory, he accumulated such a vast store of knowledge that his contemporaries styled him a wonder of the world. At 22 he began to lecture on a wide variety of subjects to large audiences attracted by his learning. 

Later he assisted with distinction at the Council of Basle.
During a visit to the papal court at Siena in 1443, he was denounced to Pope Eugene IV as having publicly defended a heretic and some rash propositions, but in an explanatory letter he assured the pontiff of his orthodoxy.
On his return to Spain, in 1444, he was appointed Grand Chancellor  and councillor of John II of Castile. In 1454, shortly before his premature death (likely in his forties or early fifties), he was named Bishop of Ávila.
His sepulcher in Avila was carved by Vasco de la Zarza in 1518.

Works
In his Defensorium, written against Juan de Torquemada and other critics, he gave utterance to views derogatory to the authority of the pope. 
Besides a Spanish commentary on the chronicles of Eusebius and other minor works, he wrote commentaries on the historical books of the Old Testament as far as Second Chronicles, and on the Gospel according to St. Matthew. These are diffuse, containing many digressions on dogmatic and other subjects. 
Tostado's works exercised a significant influence on the Jewish Bible commentator and statesman Isaac Abravanel (1437-1508).

An edition of his works in 13 folio volumes was published at Venice in 1507 and 1547; a more complete edition in 24 folio volumes appeared at the same place in 1615, and another in 27 folio volumes in 1728.

References

 Bechtel, F., Alonso Tostado, The Catholic Encyclopedia (1912).
Fontanus, Franciscus  (ed).Alphonsi Tostati Hispani ... Opera nuperrime vetustissimo originali configurata (1615) ( google books).
Hansen, Joseph, Quellen und Untersuchungen zur Geschichte des Hexenwahns und der Hexenverfolgung in Mittelalter, Bonn: Carl Georgi, 1901.
Gaon, Solomon, The Influence of the Catholic Theologian Alfonso Tostado on the Pentateuch Commentary of Isaac Abravanel (Hoboken, NJ: Ktav & Sephardic House, 1993).
Suarez P.L., Noematica biblico-mesianica de Alfonso de Matrigal, Obispo de Avila (1400-1455), Madrid (1956).
Tomás González Rolán/Antonio López Fonseca: Fernández de Madrigal, Alfonso: Breuiloquium de amore et amicitia = Tratado de amor y amiçiçia. I, De amore. Estudio y edición crítica bilingüe de los textos latino y romance. Madrid: Guillermo Escolar 2021, ISBN 978-84-18093-74-6.

External links 
 

1455 deaths
University of Salamanca alumni
Academic staff of the University of Salamanca
Spanish Christian theologians
15th-century Roman Catholic bishops in Castile